Charles Flowers is the name of:
Charles Dickie Flowers (1850–1892)
Charles Wes Flowers (1913–1988)
Charlie Flowers (1937–2014)

See also
Charles Flower (disambiguation)
Flowers (surname)